Geli (Gelli) is a rural locality (a selo) in Karabudakhkentsky District, Republic of Dagestan, Russia. The population was 2,798 as of 2010. There are 46 streets.

Geography 
Geli is located 16 km northwest of Karabudakhkent (the district's administrative centre) by road. Paraul and Adanak are the nearest rural localities.

Demographics 
There are Kumyk residents in Geli.

References 

Rural localities in Karabudakhkentsky District